Marcin Klatt (born May 4, 1985 in Poznań) is a Polish former footballer who played as a striker.

External links

 

1985 births
Living people
Footballers from Poznań
Polish footballers
Pogoń Szczecin players
Warta Poznań players
Legia Warsaw players
Lech Poznań players
Korona Kielce players
Kolejarz Stróże players
Association football forwards